Death, in comics, may refer to:

Characters
 The personification of death in comics:
 Death (DC Comics)
 Death (Marvel Comics)
 Death, a member of the Horsemen of Apocalypse
 Doctor Death (character), a DC Comics supervillain
 Lady Death, a Chaos! Comics, CrossGen Comics and Avatar Press character

Other uses
 Comic book death, the deaths of characters in comic books
 "The Death of Superman"
 "The Death of Buffy"

See also
 Death (disambiguation)
 Grim Reaper (Marvel Comics), a Marvel Comics supervillain and brother of Wonder Man
 Grim Reaper (Nedor Comics), a superhero from Nedor Comics

Comics about personifications of death